Dyckman Street may refer to:

 Dyckman Street, a street in the Inwood neighborhood of Manhattan, New York City

New York City Subway stations
Dyckman Street (IND Eighth Avenue Line), serving the  train
Dyckman Street (IRT Broadway – Seventh Avenue Line), serving the  train